Mehran Alam (born 20 May 1995) is a Pakistani cricketer who plays for Peshawar. He made his first-class debut on 16 November 2015 in the 2015–16 Quaid-e-Azam Trophy.

References

External links
 

1995 births
Living people
Pakistani cricketers
Peshawar cricketers
People from Lower Dir District